Schwarzer Berg may refer to:

 Schwarzer Berg (Jauernick), a mountain of Saxony, Germany
 Schwarzer Berg (Spessart), a hill of Hesse, Germany